Joshua Robert Risdon (born 27 July 1992) is an Australian professional football (soccer) player who currently plays as a right back for Western United.
Risdon has represented Australia on several occasions since debuting in 2015.

Club career
Risdon made his senior debut for Perth Glory on 28 November 2010, starting against the North Queensland Fury. During his debut season he made six appearances in total, including three straight starts between rounds 24 and 26.

In the 2011–12 season Risdon established himself as a regular starting 24 matches at 19 years of age.

He scored his first career goal in round 26 of the 2012-13 A-League season with the winning goal in the 94th minute against Melbourne Victory (3–2).

On 20 July 2013, Risdon played for the A-League All-Stars against Manchester United in a friendly match.

Injury plagued his 2013–14 season before he returned to the starting side for 25 appearances in the 2014–15 season. He also scored his second career goal on 28 March 2015 with an 88th minute winner over Western Sydney Wanderers (3–2).

In May 2017, Risdon left the Glory and moved to Western Sydney Wanderers.

On 12 February 2019, Risden signed on a two year deal for A-League expansion club Western United FC after his contract with Western Sydney Wanderers expired.

International career
On 7 March 2011 he was selected to represent the Australia Olympic football team in an Asian Olympic Qualifier match against Iraq.

Risdon made his senior debut for the Socceroos in a 2018 World Cup qualifying match against Bangladesh on 17 November 2015.

In May 2018 he was named in Australia’s 23-man squad for the 2018 World Cup in Russia.

Career statistics

Club

International
Statistics accurate as of match played 6 January 2019.

Honours
Western United
A-League Men Championship: 2021–22

Individual
Perth Glory Most Glorious Player: 2011–12
 A-League All Star: 2013
PFA A-League Team of the Season: 2015–16

References

External links

1992 births
Living people
People from Bunbury, Western Australia
Association football defenders
Australian soccer players
Perth Glory FC players
Western Sydney Wanderers FC players
Western United FC players
A-League Men players
Australia international soccer players
2018 FIFA World Cup players
2019 AFC Asian Cup players